James Ager Worthy (born February 27, 1961) is an American sports commentator, television host, analyst, and former professional basketball player. Nicknamed "Big Game James", he played his entire professional career with the Los Angeles Lakers in the National Basketball Association (NBA). Worthy was a seven-time NBA All-Star, a two-time All-NBA Team member who won three NBA championships and was voted the NBA Finals MVP in 1988. He was named to both the NBA's 50th and 75th anniversary teams.

A standout college basketball player for the North Carolina Tar Heels, the small forward was a consensus first-team All-American and shared national player of the year honors en route to leading his team to the 1982 NCAA championship.  Named the tournament's Most Outstanding Player, he was selected by the Lakers with the first overall pick of the 1982 NBA draft.

Early life
Worthy was born in Gastonia, North Carolina. His 21.5 points, 12.5 rebounds and 5.5 assists per game during his senior season at Ashbrook High led the team to the state championship game.  Named both a Parade Magazine and McDonald's All-American, he was  selected to play in the 1979 McDonald's All-American Game, which featured future fellow Hall of Famers including Isiah Thomas, Dominique Wilkins, and Ralph Sampson.

College career
After graduating from high school, Worthy attended the University of North Carolina at Chapel Hill.  An immediate standout as a freshman, his debut was cut short near mid-season by a broken ankle.  As a sophomore, he was a key member of UNC's 1981 NCAA runner-up team starring alongside Al Wood and Sam Perkins.

As a junior power forward Worthy was the leading scorer (15.6 points per game) of a Tar Heels NCAA championship team that featured one of the greatest collections of talent in collegiate basketball history, including future NBA stars sophomore Sam Perkins and freshman Michael Jordan. A consensus first-team All-American, Worthy was named co-winner of the Helms Foundation Player of the Year with Ralph Sampson of Virginia. He dominated the 1982 championship game against the Georgetown Hoyas, sealing the Tar Heels' 63–62 victory by intercepting an inadvertent pass thrown by Hoya point guard Fred Brown with just seconds remaining. His 13–17 shooting, 28 point, 4 rebound finale capped a standout performance throughout the NCAA tournament, earning him its Most Outstanding Player award.  A tip dunk in front of Patrick Ewing captioned "James Worthy slams the door on Georgetown" made the cover of Sports Illustrated.

In the wake of this success Worthy elected to forgo his senior year and enter the NBA draft.  He completed his degree later, via summer school.  He is one of eight players to have their numbers retired by the Tar Heels. In 2002, Worthy was named to the ACC 50th Anniversary men's basketball team honoring the fifty greatest players in Atlantic Coast Conference history.

NBA career

Number 1 pick
The Los Angeles Lakers had received the Cleveland Cavaliers' 1982 first-round draft pick in a 1979 exchange for Don Ford. The Cavaliers finished with the NBA's worst record in the 1981–82 season, leaving a coin toss to decide whether they or the worst record runner-up San Diego Clippers would get the first overall pick in the upcoming draft. The Lakers won the flip, the first and only time a reigning NBA champion picked first overall. They chose Worthy over  Dominique Wilkins and Terry Cummings.

1982–1983
The lanky small forward immediately made an impact as a rookie, averaging 13.4 points per game and shooting a Laker rookie record .579 field goal percentage.  With his speed, dynamic ability to score with either hand, and dazzling play above the rim, Worthy thrived in the Lakers' high-octane "Showtime" offense. When not finishing fast breaks with his trademark Statue of Liberty dunks or swooping finger rolls, Worthy was also one of the best post players at his position, with a quick spin move off the low blocks and a deadly turnaround midrange jumpshot. His rookie year ended just when he was hitting his stride, breaking his leg on April 10, 1983, while landing improperly after trying to tap in a missed shot against the Phoenix Suns. He was still named to the 1983 All-Rookie First Team but missed the rest of the season and playoffs, with the Lakers being swept 4–0 by the Philadelphia 76ers in the Finals.

1983–1984
Back and healthy for the opening of the 1983–84 season, Worthy's effective play soon had him replacing All-Star and fan-favorite Jamaal Wilkes in the starting line-up. The Lakers dominated throughout the Western Conference Playoffs and faced the Boston Celtics in the Finals. Late in Game 2, Worthy made an errant cross-court pass that was picked off by Gerald Henderson and taken in for the game-tying score, leading to a Celtics win in overtime. The series would go seven games, ending in a Boston victory.  Worthy had a very strong Finals, with 22.1 pts per game (second to Jabbar) on 63.8% shooting.  The Lakers would go into the off-season bitter about the loss and motivated for 1985.

1984–1985
A peak Lakers "Showtime" team dominated the West in 1985 and returned to the NBA Finals. During the play-off run Worthy emerged as a feared clutch performer, averaging 21.5 points per game on 62.2% shooting in the playoffs and 23.7 points per game in a match-up against the Celtics in the championship series. His all-round play helped lead the team to a 4–2 victory cinched on the celebrated parquet floor of the old Boston Garden and confirmed him as one of the league's premier players. It was also in 1985 that Worthy first donned goggles after suffering a scratched cornea during a March 13 game at the Utah Jazz, wearing them for the rest of his career.

1985–1986
The 1985–86 season held tremendous promise for the Lakers, who again stormed through the regular season and seemed destined to meet Boston once again. 
Worthy continued to improve, raising his scoring from 17.6 to 20 points per game on 58% shooting and was named to the first of seven consecutive All-Star appearances. A trip to the Finals disappeared in a preternatural tip in the Western Conference final by 7' 4" Houston Rockets star Ralph Sampson, with the Rockets going on to be drubbed by the Celtics in the Championship series.

1986–1987
With stalwart center Abdul-Jabbar finally showing signs of his age the Lakers added center-forward Mychal Thompson during the 1986–1987 regular season to address the need for frontcourt help.  The result was a 65–17 record and what many regard as one of the NBA's all-time great teams sprinting to another NBA title over the Celtics. Worthy was at the top of his game, leading the team with 23.6 points per game in the playoffs. He had a number of huge games during this '87 play-off run, in particular a vintage 39 point performance (including 6 dunks) in a 122–121 win at Seattle in Game 3 of the Western Conference Finals and 33 pts 10 assists 9 rebounds in a game 1 victory in the NBA Finals versus the Celtics.  The Lakers won the championship 4 games to 2.

1987–1988
Once again Riley drove the Lakers hard in 1987–88. During the regular season Worthy averaged 19.7 points and scored a career-high 38 points against the Atlanta Hawks. He led the Lakers in scoring in the 1988 play-offs and led the NBA in points scored during the play-offs.  During the Finals against the Pistons Worthy once again excelled, averaging 22 ppg, 7.4 rebounds, and 4.4 assists in the series. A 28-point, 9 rebound Game 6 and monster 36–16–10 triple-double that carried the Lakers to victory in Game 7 earned Worthy the NBA Finals MVP award and the Lakers the first back-to-back titles in the NBA since '68–'69 Celtics.

1988–1989
With Riley clamoring for a "Three-peat" in 1988–89 the Lakers marched through the regular season and met the Pistons for an encore in the Finals. With Abdul-Jabbar playing his last games and Johnson and Byron Scott missing three due to injuries even Worthy at his play-off best was not nearly enough.  In spite of averaging a career Finals high 25.5 ppg, including a career-high 40 points trying to stave off elimination in Game 4, the Lakers were swept in four.

1989–1990
The Lakers ran hot again in 1989–90 despite internal friction that had developed during Pat Riley's final year as head coach, their 63–19 record the NBA's best. Worthy averaged 21.1 points per game and became the first player in NBA history to shoot at least 53% in each of his first eight seasons. In spite of stepped-up performances by both Johnson (25.2 ppg) and Worthy (24.2 ppg) in the play-offs, LA fell in the Conference semifinals to a hot Phoenix Suns team.

1990–1991
The Lakers once more won the West in 1991 and marched through the playoffs to the Finals thanks to Worthy's team-leading and career-high 21.4 ppg in '91 and the addition of former North Carolina Tarheel star Sam Perkins at center.  Unfortunately, Worthy suffered a high ankle sprain in Game 5 of the Western Conference Finals against the Blazers and was very limited heading into the Finals against the Chicago Bulls.  Despite LA pulling out a Game 1 victory in Chicago it ultimately wasn't enough against a surging Bulls squad led by another teammate from the  1982 NCAA Championship team, an emergent Michael Jordan.  The Lakers ultimately fell in five, with Worthy sidelined for Game 5 after re-injuring his ankle the previous game.

Retirement
Johnson's sudden retirement in November 1991 threw the Lakers franchise into disarray.  Injuries and high mileage soon spelled the end for Worthy. The high ankle injury during the 1991 playoffs and season-ending knee surgery in 1992 robbed much of his quickness and leaping ability, and with it both his ability to finish on the fast break and drive to the hoop to score.  After struggling with knee pain in the 1994–95 preseason and no prospects of another title run in any foreseeable future, Worthy announced his retirement in November 1994, after 12 seasons in the NBA.

"Big Game James"
Even on Lakers teams dominated by fellow Hall of Fame members Abdul-Jabbar and Johnson, Worthy stood out as a star during their years together. He led the Lakers in playoff scoring in their championship runs in 1987 (23.6) and 1988 (21.1) and was second to Abdul-Jabbar in the 1985 championship run (21.5). He always saved his best for the playoffs and averaged 3.5 points higher per game than in the regular season.  That, spectacular offensive displays, and flashes of defensive brilliance, cemented his legacy as "Big Game James".

Worthy played in 926 NBA regular-season games, averaging 17.6 points, 5.1 rebounds and three assists per game. He played in 143 playoff games and averaged 21.1 points, 5.2 rebounds and 3.2 assists per game and had a 54.4 field goal percentage.  In 34 NBA Finals games he averaged 22.2 pts per game on 53% shooting. Worthy played in 4 Game 7s in his career and averaged 27 points 8.2 rebounds on 60% shooting in these winner-take-all contests.  He ranks sixth all-time in Lakers team scoring (16,320), third all-time in team steals (1,041) and seventh all-time in team field goal percentage (.521). Worthy was voted one of the 50 Greatest Players in NBA History in 1996 and named to the NBA 75th Anniversary Team in 2021. To commemorate the NBA's 75th Anniversary The Athletic ranked their top 75 players of all time, and named Worthy as the 59th greatest player in NBA history. Worthy was inducted into the Naismith Memorial Basketball Hall of Fame in 2003.  His jersey No. 42 was retired by the Lakers.

NBA career statistics

Regular season

|-
| style="text-align:left;"|
| style="text-align:left;"|L.A. Lakers
| 77 || 1 || 25.6 || .579 || .250 || .624 || 5.2 || 1.7 || 1.2 || .8 || 13.4
|-
| style="text-align:left;"|
| style="text-align:left;"|L.A. Lakers
| style="background:#cfecec;"|82* || 53 || 29.5 || .556 || .000 || .759 || 6.3 || 2.5 || .9 || .9 || 14.5
|-
| style="text-align:left; background:#afe6ba;"|†
| style="text-align:left;"|L.A. Lakers
| 80 || 76 || 33.7 || .572 || .000 || .776 || 6.4 || 2.5 || 1.1 || .8 || 17.6
|-
| style="text-align:left;"|
| style="text-align:left;"|L.A. Lakers
| 75 || 73 || 32.7 || .579 || .000 || .771 || 5.2 || 2.7 || 1.1 || 1.0 || 20.0
|-
| style="text-align:left; background:#afe6ba;"|†
| style="text-align:left;"|L.A. Lakers
| style="background:#cfecec;"|82* || 82 || 34.4 || .539 || .000 || .751 || 5.7 || 2.8 || 1.3 || 1.0 || 19.4
|-
| style="text-align:left; background:#afe6ba;"|†
| style="text-align:left;"|L.A. Lakers
| 75 || 72 || 35.4 || .531 || .125 || .796 || 5.0 || 3.9 || 1.0 || .7 || 19.7
|-
| style="text-align:left;"|
| style="text-align:left;"|L.A. Lakers
| 81 || 81 || 36.5 || .548 || .087 || .782 || 6.0 || 3.6 || 1.3 || .7 || 20.5
|-
| style="text-align:left;"|
| style="text-align:left;"|L.A. Lakers
| 80 || 80 || 37.0 || .548 || .306 || .782 || 6.0 || 3.6 || 1.2 || .6 || 21.1
|-
| style="text-align:left;"|
| style="text-align:left;"|L.A. Lakers
| 78 || 74 || 38.6 || .492 || .289 || .797 || 4.6 || 3.5 || 1.3 || .4 || 21.4
|-
| style="text-align:left;"|
| style="text-align:left;"|L.A. Lakers
| 54 || 54 || 39.0 || .447 || .209 || .814 || 5.6 || 4.7 || 1.4 || .4 || 19.9
|-
| style="text-align:left;"|
| style="text-align:left;"|L.A. Lakers
| 82 || 69 || 28.8 || .447 || .270 || .810 || 3.0 || 3.4 || 1.1 || .3 || 14.9
|-
| style="text-align:left;"|
| style="text-align:left;"|L.A. Lakers
| 80 || 2 || 20.0 || .406 || .288 || .741 || 2.3 || 1.9 || .6 || .2 || 10.2
|- class="sortbottom"
| style="text-align:center;" colspan="2"|Career
| 926 || 717 || 32.4 || .521 || .241 || .769 || 5.1 || 3.0 || 1.1 || .7 || 17.6

Playoffs

|-
| style="text-align:left;"|1984
| style="text-align:left;"|L.A. Lakers
| 21 || 0 || 33.7 || .599 || .500 || .609 || 5.0 || 2.7 || 1.3 || .5 || 17.7
|-
| style="text-align:left; background:#afe6ba;"|1985†
| style="text-align:left;"|L.A. Lakers
| 19 || 19 || 32.9 || .622 || .500 || .676 || 5.1 || 2.2 || .9 || .7 || 21.5
|-
| style="text-align:left;"|1986
| style="text-align:left;"|L.A. Lakers
| 14 || 14 || 38.5 || .558 || .000 || .681 || 4.6 || 3.2 || 1.1 || .7 || 19.6
|-
| style="text-align:left; background:#afe6ba;"|1987†
| style="text-align:left;"|L.A. Lakers
| 18 || 18 || 37.8 || .591 || .000 || .753 || 5.6 || 3.5 || 1.6 || 1.2 || 23.6
|-
| style="text-align:left; background:#afe6ba;"|1988†
| style="text-align:left;"|L.A. Lakers
| 24 || 24 || 37.3 || .523 || .111 || .758 || 5.8 || 4.4 || 1.4 || .8 || 21.1
|-
| style="text-align:left;"|1989
| style="text-align:left;"|L.A. Lakers
| 15 || 15 || 40.0 || .567 || .375 || .788 || 6.7 || 2.8 || 1.2 || 1.1 || 24.8
|-
| style="text-align:left;"|1990
| style="text-align:left;"|L.A. Lakers
| 9 || 9 || 40.7 || .497 || .250 || .837 || 5.6 || 3.0 || 1.6 || .3 || 24.2
|-
| style="text-align:left;"|1991
| style="text-align:left;"|L.A. Lakers
| 18 || 18 || 40.7 || .465 || .167 || .736 || 4.1 || 3.9 || 1.1 || .1 || 21.1
|-
| style="text-align:left;"|1993
| style="text-align:left;"|L.A. Lakers
| 5 || 0 || 29.6 || .372 || .250 || .600 || 3.4 || 2.6 || 1.0 || .0 || 13.8
|- class="sortbottom"
| style="text-align:center;" colspan="2"|Career
| 143 || 117 || 37.0 || .544 || .209 || .727 || 5.2 || 3.2 || 1.2 || .7 || 21.1

Post-NBA

TV career
Worthy was a studio analyst for Time Warner Cable SportsNet and Time Warner Cable Deportes and co-host of Access SportsNet, the networks' pregame and postgame show for Lakers game telecasts on in Los Angeles; he also served as an NBA analyst for KCBS-TV in Los Angeles.

Worthy has acted in several television shows. He portrayed the Klingon Koral in the Star Trek: The Next Generation episode "Gambit, Part II". He also guest starred as himself on Everybody Loves Raymond and Webster.

Coaching career
On September 28, 2015, Worthy was hired to work with the Lakers coaching staff with a focus on the team's big men.

Personal life
Worthy was married for 12 years to Angela Wilder, whom he met in 1981 at the University of North Carolina where she was a cheerleader while he was playing. The couple had two daughters before divorcing in 1996.

On November 14, 1990, Worthy was arrested in Houston, and charged with two counts of solicitation of prostitution in a Houston police department sting operation. He was sentenced to one year of probation, fined $1,000 and ordered to perform 40 hours of community service.

Philanthropy
Worthy is the founder of the James Worthy Foundation, and dedicates a substantial amount of his time and resources to support non-profit community organizations such as Boys & Girls Clubs, Big Brothers of America, YMCA, and others.

See also
 List of National Basketball Association career playoff scoring leaders

References

External links

 
 

1961 births
Living people
African-American basketball players
All-American college men's basketball players
American men's basketball players
Basketball players from North Carolina
College basketball announcers in the United States
Los Angeles Lakers assistant coaches
Los Angeles Lakers draft picks
Los Angeles Lakers players
McDonald's High School All-Americans
Naismith Memorial Basketball Hall of Fame inductees
National Basketball Association All-Stars
National Basketball Association players with retired numbers
National Basketball Association broadcasters
National Collegiate Basketball Hall of Fame inductees
North Carolina Tar Heels men's basketball players
Parade High School All-Americans (boys' basketball)
People from Gastonia, North Carolina
Small forwards
21st-century African-American people
20th-century African-American sportspeople
University of North Carolina at Chapel Hill alumni